Kasawo is an urban centre in the Mukono District, Central Region of Uganda.

Location
The coordinates of Kasawo are 0° 40' 48.00"N, 32° 49' 30.00"E (Latitude:0.6800; Longitude:32.8250).

Overview
Kasawo lies in a relatively fertile valley. The surrounding communities are sources of food crops such as bananas, pineapples, pumpkins, and sugar cane, along with cash crops like coffee.

The prevalent diseases in the community include malaria, respiratory infections, diarrheal diseases, and problems related to access of antenatal and postnatal care. HIV/AIDS prevention and treatment is also a concern.

Recent developments
, students from Drake University, a private institution of higher education in Des Moines, Iowa, United States, in collaboration with the Shining Star Foundation, a US-based non-governmental organization, and with Des Moines Rotary AM and with Sunrise Rotary of Kampala, were in the process of building a self-sustaining Level II health center in Kasawo. The aim of the project is to relieve the acute lack of healthcare services in Kasawo and surrounding communities. The health center plans to use St. Francis Hospital Nagalama as its referral center.

Points of interest
The following points of interest lie within or near Kasawo:
 offices of Kasawo Town Council
 Kasawo central market

References

External links
 Traveling Around The World: Kasawo, Uganda

Populated places in Central Region, Uganda
Mukono District
Cities in the Great Rift Valley